Antoni Vila Arrufat (1894–1989) was a Spanish engraver from Sabadell in Catalonia.

References

Bibliography
 Antoni Vila Arrufat [exhibition catalogue]. Madrid: Artigrafia, 1971.
 Antoni Vila Arrufat. Gravats [exhibition catalogue]. Barcelona: Departament de Cultura, Generalitat de Catalunya, 1991.
 A. Vila Arrufat. Pintures 1918-1976 [exhibition catalogue]. Sabadell: Pinacoteca Sabadell, 1977.
 Cartells de Festa Major. Impresos, originals, programes i fotografies [exhibition catalogue]. Sabadell: Arxiu Històric de Sabadell, Muse d'Art de Sabadell, 1983.
 CASAMARTINA PARASSOLS, Josep: Marian Burguès. Un terrisser que va fer història. Sabadell: Fundació Caixa de Sabadell, Patronat dels Museus Municipals de Sabadell, 1993.
 CASAMARTINA PARASSOLS, Josep: Vila Arrufat a Sabadell. Sabadell: Comissió pro-centenari del pintor Antoni Vila Arrufat, 1994.
 CASTELLS PEIG, Eduard: L'art sabadellenc. Sabadell: Ed. Riutort, 1961.
 Centenari Antoni Vila Arrufat (1894-1994) [exhibition catalogue]. Barcelona: Departament de Cultura, Generalitat de Catalunya, 1994.
 El Noucentisme. Un projecte de modernitat [exhibition catalogue]. Barcelona: Departament de Cultura, Generalitat de Catalunya, Enciclopèdia Catalana, 1994.
 Gent de mar. Pintura costumista catalana ss. XIX i XX [exhibition catalogue]. Vilassar de Mar: Museu de la Marina, 1993.
 Volum 20 (2004), Gran Enciclopèdia Catalana, Barcelona, Edicions 62. 
 La collecció 1875-1936. Sabadell: Museu d'Art de Sabadell, Ajuntament de Sabadell, 2002, p. 154-161.
 Llegat Enric Palà Girvent [exhibition catalogue]. Sabadell: Centenari Sabadell Ciutat, Museu d'Art de Sabadell, 1977.
 Llegat Joan Figueras Crehueras [exhibition catalogue]. Sabadell: Museu d'Art de Sabadell, 1978.
 MATES, Joan: La jove pintura local. Sabadell: Biblioteca Sabadellenca, núm. 15, 1927, p. 83-129.
 MERLI, Joan: 33 Pintors catalans. Barcelona: Comissariat de Propaganda de la Generalitat de Catalunya, 1937, p. 207-212.
 RÀFOLS, J.F.: Diccionario biográfico de artistas de Cataluña, vol. III. Barcelona: Millà, 1954, p. 235.
 Vila Arrufat [exhibition catalogue]. Barcelona: Palau de la Virreina, Ajuntament de Barcelona, 1984.
 Antonio Gallego Gallego (1979). Historia del grabado en España. Madrid, Ediciones Cátedra. 
 Gabriel Jackson (2004). «Los Vila». Barcelona, Meteora. 
 Eusebi Vila Delclòs (2004). «Antoni Vila Arrufat». Barcelona, Editorial Meteora. 
 Francesc Fontbona (1980). Vila Arrufat. Maestros actuales de la pintura. 

1894 births
1989 deaths
20th-century engravers
Spanish engravers
Painters from Catalonia
20th-century Spanish painters
20th-century Spanish male artists
Spanish male painters